Kawkaba, known to the Crusaders as Coquebel, was a Palestinian Arab village that was occupied by Israel during Operation Yoav during the 1948 Arab-Israeli War, and depopulated.

Location
The village was situated on an uneven stretch of red-brown soil on the southern coastal plain. It lay on the highway constructed by the British during World War II, which paralleled the coastal highway.

History
The site was known during the Crusades as Coquebel. Kawkaba contained an  archaeological site with a pool, cisterns, the foundations of buildings, columns, severed capitals. North of it was Khirbat Kamas, which was identified as the Crusader Camsa and which yielded some archaeological artifacts.

Ottoman era
Kawkaba was incorporated into the Ottoman Empire in 1517 with the rest of Palestine, and by 1596 tax record it was  known as Kawkab, with a population of 16 Muslim households; an estimated 88 persons. The villagers paid  a fixed tax rate of 33,3%  on a number of crops, including wheat, barley, sesame, fruit trees and vineyards; a total of 2,640 akçe. 6/24 of the revenue went to a waqf.

In 1838, Edward Robinson   noted Kaukaba as a Muslim village, located in the Gaza district.

In 1863 Victor Guérin  found that the village has a population of five hundred inhabitants. In the interior of a oualy dedicated to Sheikh Mohammed he observed  mutilated fluted white marble column,  next to a Corinthian capital. At the well, he noted two barrels, also ancient columns, one with white marble, the second gray granite, which were, he thought, exhumed in that area and did not come from elsewhere.

An Ottoman village list of about 1870  showed Kokabe with a population of 72, in 20 houses,  though the population count included men, only. 

In 1882, the PEF's Survey of Western Palestine described it as a small adobe village, with a well to the west and a pool to the north. The village had a rectangular layout along the above-mentioned road, and expanded north–south alongside it.

British Mandate era
In the 1922 census of Palestine, conducted by the  British Mandate  authorities,  Kukaba had a population of 439,  all Muslims, increasing in the 1931 census  to 522, still all Muslims, in  121 houses.

Kawkaba shared an elementary school with the villages of Bayt Tima and Hulayqat. Its houses were made of adobe and cement, and its shops were located at the village center, on the western side of the road. On its eastern site were two water sources: a spring and a 70-meter deep well. The villagers  engaged in rainfed agriculture, cultivating grain and winter and summer vegetables. Towards the end of the British Mandate period they also cultivated fruits, such as figs and grapes, on all their land expect to the west.

In  the 1945 statistics   the population of  Kaukaba  was 680 Muslims, while  the total land area was 8,542 dunams, according to an official land and population survey. Of this, a total of  166 dunams  were used  for plantations and irrigable land,  8,166  for cereals, while 40 dunams were built-up areas.

1948 and after
The village that was captured by Israel during Operation Yoav during the 1948 Arab-Israeli War. The fall of the village was preceded by the events at nearby Burayr; where the Haganah Oded Brigade apparently executed a large number of military age Palestinians. The Kawkaba villages had offered to surrender to the Yishuv's forces but the Haganah drove out the last of the inhabitants on the 27/28 May 1948. The village was on the front line between the Israeli and Egyptian armies through the summer of 1948 and appears to have changed hands several times.

Following the war the area was incorporated into the State of Israel and in 1950 the moshav of Kokhav Michael was founded on village land, southeast of the village site.

According  to Khalidi, by 1992 the  remaining structures on the village land were: 
"The site is overgrown with sycamore and Christ´s -thorn trees. The old road, as well as crumbled walls and debris in a wooded part of the site are clearly visible. The land in the vicinity is cultivated by Israeli farmers."

References

Bibliography

External links
Kawkaba Palestine Remembered
Kawkaba, Zochrot
Survey of Western Palestine, Map 20:   IAA, Wikimedia commons 
Kawkaba from the Khalil Sakakini Cultural Center

District of Gaza
Arab villages depopulated during the 1948 Arab–Israeli War